In New Hampshire, the communities of Dixville Notch, Hart's Location, and Millsfield all vote at the midnight beginning election day, known as the New Hampshire midnight votes, on the day of the state's political party primaries and general elections, following a tradition that started to accommodate railroad workers who had to be at work before normal voting hours. The voting tradition has been followed in Dixville Notch since the 1960 presidential election, in Hart's Location from 1948 to 1964 and since 1996, and in Millsfield since 2016. 

Although the communities have small populations, some major political candidates campaign in the area due to New Hampshire having the first presidential primary in the nation, with George H. W. Bush, George W. Bush, Bill Clinton, Ronald Reagan, Bob Dole, John McCain, and Dick Gephardt visiting the towns. Multiple third-party candidates, such as Andre Marrou during the 1992 presidential election, have also campaigned in the area to gain media attention.

1964
In 1964, both Dixville Notch and Hart's Location gave the majority of their votes to the write-in candidacies of the 1960 Republican presidential and vice presidential candidates Richard Nixon and Henry Cabot Lodge II.

1972
In 1972, former Vice President Richard Nixon and Senator Edmund Muskie won their respective primaries in Dixville Notch.

1976
During the 1976 presidential campaign, former California Governor Ronald Reagan was the only major party presidential candidate to visit Dixville Notch. President Gerald Ford won the Republican primary while Georgia Governor Jimmy Carter won the Democratic primary.

1980
During the 1980 presidential campaign, former CIA director George H. W. Bush visited Dixville Notch. President Jimmy Carter won the Democratic primary and former California Governor Ronald Reagan was initially declared the winner of the Republican primary with six votes, but it was discovered that a vote for Senator Howard Baker was accidentally given to Reagan changing the vote to a tie between Reagan and Bush.

1984
During the 1984 presidential campaign Senator Fritz Hollings and former Florida Governor Reubin Askew were the only major party presidential candidates to visit Dixville Notch. Hollings met with the town's four registered Democrats and four independents on February 19, 1984, while former Vice President Walter Mondale and Senator Gary Hart personally made phone calls to the area. Hollings won the Democratic midnight vote and President Ronald Reagan won the Republican, with the remaining Republican votes being write-ins for Hollings.

1988
During the 1988 presidential campaign Senator Paul Laxalt, former Secretary of State Alexander Haig, and Representative Dick Gephardt visited Dixville Notch, while former Governor Meldrim Thomson Jr. campaigned for Pat Robertson in the area. Haig announced his campaign on March 24, 1987, in New York and then traveled to Dixville Notch later in the day after opening his headquarters in New Hampshire. Gephardt narrowly won the town with four of its seven votes while Vice President George H. W. Bush received eleven out of twenty-seven votes in their primaries.

1992
During the 1992 presidential campaign Pat Buchanan, Andre Marrou, and Ralph Nader visited Dixville Notch, while Vice President Dan Quayle and Bonnie Newman, chief of operations for Chief of Staff John H. Sununu, campaigned for President Bush, and members of Bob Kerrey's campaign made calls to residents of Dixville Notch. Governor Bill Clinton won the Democratic primary, Bush won the Republican primary, and Marrou, as the only Libertarian, won the Libertarian primary.

1996
During the 1996 presidential campaign, Senator Bob Dole and his wife Elizabeth Dole visited the area in August, 1995 and Pat Buchanan and Morry Taylor later visited the area. Dole narrowly won the Republican primary while President Bill Clinton received unanimous support marking the first time since 1980 that the winner of the midnight voting communities also won statewide although Clinton faced no serious opposition.

2000
During the 2000 presidential campaign, Texas Governor George W. Bush and Senator John McCain visited Dixville Notch. This was the last time that Neil Tillotson voted first in the Dixville Notch midnight vote before his death in 2001. In the Republican primary Bush won Dixville Notch while McCain won Hart's Location and in the Democratic primary Senator Bill Bradley won both towns. In the general election Bush won both towns against Vice President Al Gore.

2004
During the 2004 presidential campaign, General Wesley Clark was the only major party presidential candidate to visit the area. President George W. Bush won the Republican primaries with unanimous support while in the Democratic primary Clark won both towns.

2008

During the 2008 presidential campaign, former New York City Mayor Rudy Giuliani visited Dixville Notch. Senator John McCain won both towns in the Republican primary and Senator Barack Obama won both towns in the Democratic primary.

2016
During the 2016 presidential campaign, Ohio Governor John Kasich was the only major party presidential candidate to visit Dixville Notch with the rally he held on January 16, 2016. He later won all three precincts and tied with Senator Ted Cruz and Donald Trump for total votes. Senator Bernie Sanders won two of the precincts and 60.71% of the total vote, becoming the first Democratic candidate to win both the midnight voting precincts with major opposition and the statewide vote since 1980.

2020
During the 2020 presidential campaign, Senator Michael Bennet was the only major party presidential candidate to visit Dixville Notch before the primary, but received zero votes from all three precincts. Michael Bloomberg won both the Republican and Democratic primary in Dixville Notch as a write-in candidate, while Senator Amy Klobuchar and President Donald Trump won the other two towns in their respective primaries. In the three towns, Klobuchar won a plurality with eight votes for 29.63% of the total vote.

Due to the COVID-19 pandemic during the general election, Hart's Location delayed its traditional midnight voting to the daylight hours. Dixville Notch's population briefly fell below the minimum of five residents required to hold an election in 2019, but Les Otten moved his official residence to the community to ensure that the midnight voting tradition could continue.

Accuracy

See also
New Hampshire primary
New Hampshire Historical Marker No. 171: Dixville Notch "First in the Nation"

References